Sam and Nia are YouTube vloggers based out of Terrell, Texas  who vlog about their daily life as a Christian family. They have over 100 videos that exceed one million views, 14 videos with over 10 million views, 6 that have over 20 million views, and 1 that has over 60 million views. They first rose to prominence with a video of themselves lip-syncing to the song "Love Is an Open Door" from Frozen titled "Good Looking Parents Sing Disney's Frozen (Love Is an Open Door)". The video was an instant success and went viral in March 2014; it currently has over 23 million views.

In August 2015, Sam and Nia released another viral video of Sam surprising Nia with her own pregnancy. A few days later, they announced that their pregnancy ended in a miscarriage. They currently have over 2.6 million subscribers. They have since had a fourth child.

Relationship and marriage 
Sam and Nia met while attending Wills Point High School in Wills Point, Texas. They also simultaneously attended Trinity Valley Community College, where they both received associate degrees. Sam transferred to The University of Texas at Arlington where he received a BS degree in nursing. They dated for about 5 years until they married in Wills Point on September 12, 2009. Sam worked as an ER nurse and Nia as a manager of a Maurices store at the Tanger Factory Outlet Center in Terrell, Texas for the first four years of their marriage. On July 18, 2010, their daughter Symphony Pearl Rader was born. On September 18, 2013, their son Abram Samuel was born. Juliet Elizabeth, their third child, was born on June 1, 2016. Their fourth child, Josie Grace was born on March 10, 2021.

YouTube history

Viral video of "Love Is An Open Door" lip sync 
On March 10, 2014, Sam uploaded a video titled "Good Looking Parents Sing Disney's Frozen (Love Is an Open Door)". The video was picked up by news stations and websites all over the world and quickly became a viral video. The video has amassed over 22 million views. The success of the video caused the number of subscribers to their YouTube channel to increase greatly. Within one month they had over 35,000 subscribers. Their sudden burst into Internet fame gained them the attention of Disney who had them do a cameo appearance in a music video based on another song from the movie Frozen.

Viral pregnancy announcement 
In June 2015, Sam uploaded a video of him surprising his wife with her own pregnancy by dipping a pregnancy test into a toilet bowl with her urine in it on a morning she did not flush it. The video was called, "HUSBAND SHOCKS WIFE WITH PREGNANCY ANNOUNCEMENT!" and it was immediately picked up by the media and went viral. Within two days it had over 5 million views, it currently has a total of 18 million views. The video caused a fair amount of controversy, including Vanity Fair and Mic questioning whether a man had the right to know a woman was pregnant before she knew herself. To dispute the claims made by Sam and Nia in their video, BuzzFeed interviewed a doctor and published an article casting doubt on the ability to get a positive pregnancy test result from toilet bowl water.

Miscarriage 
Three days after the pregnancy announcement video, Sam and Nia released another video (which has since been removed) announcing that their pregnancy had ended in a miscarriage. This announcement received mixed reactions. Articles and videos were made in support of them and others were made doubting the authenticity of their claims. Sam admitted that Nia had not gone to a doctor to be looked at, he said it was unnecessary because he was a registered nurse and already knew how to handle the situation. This created even more doubt. Sam and Nia have insisted that they were completely honest in their pregnancy and miscarriage videos. Sam and Nia have also insisted that they do not regret announcing the pregnancy so early. They said they feel the goal of their channel is to be authentic and allow their viewers to experience life as they experience it and allow their faith in God be demonstrated in everyday and in tragic life moments.

Scandal 
Three days after the miscarriage was announced, it was revealed that Sam had an account on the affair website Ashley Madison three years prior. Many major news websites and magazines picked up the story, including BuzzFeed, Cosmopolitan, and Perez Hilton. Two days later, Sam, with Nia by his side, released a video (now removed) acknowledging and apologizing for having the account and said that God and Nia had forgiven him. This video caused even more controversy and backlash and was seen as a cop out. Despite all of the controversy, their subscriber count grew greatly. The Ashley Madison scandal broke while Sam and Nia were attending Vlogger Fair in Seattle, where Sam encountered another family vlogger whom he accused of liking a tweet critical of him. He apparently started yelling at the other vlogger. Sam was then asked to leave Vlogger Fair, which he did without issue.

Hiatus 
After the controversies, Sam and Nia announced that they were going to take a hiatus from vlogging for an indefinite amount of time. They said they needed time to recover from their controversies and spend time on focusing on and healing their marriage and family.

Return 
A petition on Change.org was created to convince Sam and Nia to return to vlogging. Sam and Nia resumed vlogging only 33 days later, though not daily as they had before. They published vlogs several times a week, until they resumed their daily vlogging about a month later. Sam and Nia's handling of their controversy has become a formula for other religious vloggers who have had controversies: make a video acknowledging and apologizing for what happened, take a hiatus, and gradually return to vlogging.

Fourth pregnancy 
On October 23, 2015, Sam and Nia uploaded a video announcing that they were pregnant once again. They made the announcement by surprising both their mothers by placing a literal bun in the oven. This video also went viral but not to the same extent as the previous pregnancy announcement video. Their third child, daughter Juliet, was born seven months later. They continue to daily post vlogs about their family's lives on YouTube.

Rankings

Filmography

Awards and nominations

References

External links 

 

1985 births
1988 births
Living people
YouTube channels
YouTube channels launched in 2014
People from Terrell, Texas
YouTubers from Texas